Compass International Pictures was an independent American film production and distribution company founded by producers Irwin Yablans and Joseph Wolf in 1977, best known for their involvement in the production of numerous horror films between 1977 and 1981. Their first, and most notable film release was Halloween in 1978 with Falcon Films. The company closed down in 1981, before re-emerging four years later under the name Trancas International Films. As of 2016, they are the copyright holders of the Halloween film series, and have produced every film in the series to date.

Films released

As Compass International Pictures

As Trancas International Films 
 1985 Appointment with Fear 
 1986 Free Ride
 1988 Halloween 4: The Return of Michael Myers
 1989 Halloween 5: The Revenge of Michael Myers
 1995 Halloween: The Curse of Michael Myers
 1998 Halloween H20: 20 Years Later
 2002 Halloween: Resurrection
 2007 Made in Brooklyn
 2007 Halloween
 2009 Halloween II
 2014 Free Fall
 2018 Halloween
 2021 Halloween Kills
 2022 Halloween Ends

References

Mass media companies established in 1977
Mass media companies disestablished in 1981
Mass media companies established in 1985
Defunct American film studios
American companies established in 1977
American companies established in 1985
Film production companies of the United States
American independent film studios